Shoot Many Robots is a video game developed by Demiurge Studios and published by Ubisoft for Xbox Live Arcade, PlayStation Network, and Microsoft Windows via Steam. It is the first original release from the developer which previously did support work on games such as Rock Band, BioShock, and Mass Effect. Shoot Many Robots was released in March 2012 for XBLA and PSN, and a month later for Steam. The Xbox 360 version received mixed reviews–a Metacritic score of 67–while other versions received too little attention to result in a meaningful rating.

An Android port was released in 2013 on the Play Store.  An iOS version was announced in 2013, but as of 2021 has not shipped.

Gameplay
Shoot Many Robots is a shoot 'em up. Players start in the character's RV, where they may equip their character with five items: one weapon that has unlimited ammunition in the game, a special weapon with limited ammo, and hats, pants, and backpacks that can boost performance statistics such as damage given/health or impart special abilities such as slide attacks or a jetpack. They then select a stage to complete, generally following stages in a linear order, but players can return to a previously completed stage.

There are two types of stages. The most common requires the players to make their way through a level from start to finish, often ending on a final boss or a large rush of robots. Checkpoints are laid out through the course, so that if all players die, they will respawn at the last checkpoint passed. The other type of stage is a survival one, where players attempt to withstand several rounds of increasingly difficult enemies; as long as the player makes it through the first wave, they will have succeeded, but gain better rewards for lasting through bonus stages.

Players fight off robots by using their weapons, a melee attack, or any special attacks granted by their load-out. The robots have various offensive and defensive mechanisms that the players must work around.  Some will fire special slow-moving but powerful bullets that can only be stopped by melee attacking them back to the robot that fired them. Other robots are nearly impervious to attacks from one side, but are vulnerable to attacks from the opposite side. The player has a health meter that will drain when they are hit. If they take too much damage they will collapse; in multiplayer games, another player can revive them, otherwise they will start back at the last checkpoint. The player begins a level with a number of bottles of beer that can be taken to restore health.

Robots will drop nuts after dying; this is the game's currency which can be used to buy new equipment. Sometimes robots or special boxes will drop crates that contain tickets with which to purchase new equipment, or a large quantity of nuts. These rewards are tied to a player and can only be picked up by that player. Additionally, power-ups may be dropped by the robots, some giving temporary boosts like extra speed or attack damage, while others restore beer or special ammo. Killing each robot also boosts the player's experience level, which affects what equipment the player will have access to.

After completing a level, the players are rated on a star-based scoring system based on the number of nuts collected. To boost their score, players can chain robot kills together to increase a scoring multiplier up to 5x, though players must continue to kill robots to maintain this. The total cumulative stars that a player has earned will influence which levels the player has access too. Players are rewarded with additional nuts based on their relative performance. Once back in the RV, the players can then proceed to use the nuts to purchase equipment that they have obtained a ticket for and within their experience level.

The game supports co-operative play between two and four players. Individual player characters are identified by unique colors to distinguish them from others.

Reception

The Windows and Xbox 360 versions of Shoot Many Robots received "average" reviews according to the review aggregation website Metacritic. VentureBeat said of the Xbox 360 version, "As team-carnage games go, you'll get some mileage out of this one. Grab a few of your drinkin' buddies, and have yourselves a fun (and cheap) night of gratuitous hillbilly firepower and richly deserved robo-death. Preferably with your beer goggles on." IGN said of the PlayStation 3 and Xbox 360 versions, "the most identifiable problem is the controls," and called out co-op as a "chaotic mess."

References

External links

2012 video games
Android (operating system) games
Loot shooters
PlayStation Network games
Video games about robots
Horizontally scrolling shooters
Ubisoft games
Video games developed in the United States
Video games scored by Richard Vreeland
Video games with 2.5D graphics
Xbox 360 Live Arcade games
Windows games
Demiurge Studios games